Uğur Pektaş (born 16 April 1979) is a Turkish actor. His maternal family is of Albanian descent. He is best known for hit crime series "Arka Sokaklar" which played with ex wife Gamze Özçelik. Arka Sokaklar is the longest Turkish series. 

He played in series Kuşdili. He played in series Düşler ve Gerçekler with Gamze Özçelik.He was competitor in Survivor Turkey finals who won the first degree in the program, which is shown in Star TV at the time.

Filmography 
Television
 Arka Sokaklar (2006, 2009, 2010–2014, 2015, 2017)
 Kuşdili (2006)
 Düşler ve Gerçekler'' (2005)

References

External links 

Official website (in Turkish)

Living people
1979 births
Male actors from Istanbul
Turkish male television actors
Winners in the Survivor franchise
Participants in Turkish reality television series
Survivor (franchise) winners